Denis Mitchell or Dennis Mitchell may refer to:

 Denis Mitchell (filmmaker) (1911–1990), British documentary filmmaker
 Denis Mitchell (sculptor) (1912–1993), English abstract sculptor
 Dennis Mitchell (born 1966), American sprinter
 Dennis Mitchell (RAF officer) (1918–2001), British military pilot and commander
Dennis Mitchell (Dennis the Menace), fictional character